Mehdi Sabeti (born February 1, 1975) is an Iranian retired football goalkeeper and Goalkeeper coach.

Club career
Sabeti joined Tractor Sazi in 2009, after spending the previous season at Aboomoslem. On 26 February 2013 Sabeti made his AFC Champions League debut, at 38 years of age, in a 3–1 Victory over Al Jazira Club.

References

External links 
 Mehdi Sabeti  at Soccerway

1975 births
Living people
Iranian footballers
Association football goalkeepers
Tractor S.C. players
F.C. Aboomoslem players
Rah Ahan players
Persian Gulf Pro League players